Grevillea dolichopoda is a species of flowering plant in the family Proteaceae and is endemic to the south-west of Western Australia. It is a low-lying shrub with linear to more or less cylindrical leaves and groups up to four red and orange flowers with a red, green-tipped style.

Description

Taxonomy
This grevillea was first formally described in 1986 by Donald McGillivray who gave it the name Grevillea disjuncta subsp. dolichopoda in his book New names in Grevillea (Proteaceae) from specimens collected near Ongerup in 1976. In 1993 Peter M. Olde and Neil R. Marriott raised the subspecies to species status as Grevillea dolichopoda. The specific epithet (dolichopoda) means "long foot".

Distribution and habitat
Grevillea dolichopoda grows in heath or mallee shrubland from Nyabing to the Gairdner River, between Varley and Ravensthorpe, and from East Mount Barren to the lower Hamersley River in the Esperance Plains and Mallee biogeographic regions of south-western Western Australia.

See also
 List of Grevillea species

References

dolichopoda
Proteales of Australia
Eudicots of Western Australia
Taxa named by Donald McGillivray